"U Krazy Katz" is the eighth single by PJ & Duncan and the second to be taken from their second album Top Katz (1995). As a single, it was released on 1 October 1995 and reached number 15 on the UK Singles Chart.

The music video shows PJ & Duncan performing in a jazz club.

Track listing

Weekly charts

External links
Youtube.com
Discogs.com

1995 singles
Ant & Dec songs
1995 songs
Telstar Records singles
Songs written by Martin Brannigan
Songs written by Ray Hedges
Songs written by Declan Donnelly
Songs written by Anthony McPartlin